Angelman syndrome or Angelman's syndrome (AS) is a genetic disorder that mainly affects the nervous system. Symptoms include a small head and a specific facial appearance, severe intellectual disability, developmental disability, limited to no functional speech, balance and movement problems, seizures, and sleep problems. Children usually have a happy personality and have a particular interest in water. The symptoms generally become noticeable by one year of age.

Angelman syndrome is due to a lack of function of part of chromosome 15, typically due to a new mutation rather than one inherited. Most of the time, it is due to a deletion or mutation of the UBE3A gene on that chromosome. Occasionally, it is due to inheriting two copies of chromosome 15 from a person's father and none from their mother (paternal uniparental disomy). As the father's versions are inactivated by a process known as genomic imprinting, no functional version of the gene remains. Diagnosis is based on symptoms and possibly genetic testing.

No cure is available. Treatment is generally supportive in nature. Anti-seizure medications are used in those with seizures. Physical therapy and bracing may help with walking. Those affected have a nearly normal life expectancy.

AS affects 1 in 12,000 to 20,000 people. Males and females are affected with equal frequency. It is named after British pediatrician Harry Angelman, who first described the syndrome in 1965. An older term, happy puppet syndrome, is generally considered pejorative. Prader–Willi syndrome is a separate condition, caused by a similar loss of the father's chromosome 15.

Signs and symptoms
Signs and symptoms of Angelman syndrome and their relative frequency in affected individuals are:

Consistent (100%)
 Developmental delay, functionally severe
 Speech impairment, no or minimal use of words; receptive and non-verbal communication skills higher than verbal ones
 Movement or balance disorder, usually ataxia of gait and/or tremulous movement of limbs
 Behavioral characteristics of the following types: any combination of atypical frequent laughter/smiling; atypically happy demeanor; easily excitable personality, often with hand flapping movements; hypermotoric behavior; short attention span

Frequent (more than 80%)
 Delayed, disproportionate growth in head circumference, usually resulting in microcephaly (absolute or relative) by age 2
 Seizures, onset usually less than 3 years of age
 Abnormal EEG, characteristic pattern with large amplitude slow-spike waves

Associated (20–80%)

Cause

Angelman syndrome is caused by the lack of expression of a gene known as UBE3A during development. This gene is located within a region of chromosome 15 known as 15q11-q13 and is part of the ubiquitin pathway. In fact, UBE3A codes for a very selective E6-AP ubiquitin ligase for which MAPK1, PRMT5, CDK1, CDK4, β-catenin, and UBXD8 have been identified as ubiquitination targets

Typically, a fetus inherits a maternal copy of UBE3A and a paternal copy of UBE3A. In certain areas of the developing brain, the paternal copy of UBE3A is inactivated through a process known as imprinting and the fetus relies on the functioning maternal copy of UBE3A in order to develop normally. In an individual with AS, however, the maternal UBE3A gene is absent or not functioning normally. This can be due to genetic errors such as the deletion or mutation of a segment of chromosome 15, uniparental disomy, or translocation. While Angelman syndrome can be caused by a single mutation in the UBE3A gene, the most common genetic defect leading to Angelman syndrome is a 5- to 7-Mb (megabase) maternal deletion in chromosomal region 15q11.2-q13.

Specifically, the paternal copy of UBE3A is known to be imprinted within the hippocampus, cortex, thalamus, olfactory bulb, and cerebellum. Therefore, in these areas of the brain, a functioning maternal copy of UBE3A is essential for proper development.

Region 15q11-13 is implicated in both Angelman syndrome and Prader–Willi syndrome (PWS). While AS results from mutation, loss or abnormal imprinting involving the UBE3A gene within this region on the maternal chromosome, loss of a different cluster of genes within the same region on the paternal chromosome causes PWS.

The methylation test that is performed for Angelman syndrome looks for methylation on the gene's neighbor SNRPN, which is silenced by methylation on the maternal copy of the gene.

Neurophysiology
The electroencephalogram (EEG) in AS is usually abnormal, more so than clinically expected. This EEG facilitates the differential diagnosis of AS, but is not pathognomonic. Three distinct interictal patterns are seen in these patients. The most common pattern is a very large amplitude 2–3 Hz rhythm most prominent in prefrontal leads. Next most common is a symmetrical 4–6 Hz high voltage rhythm. The third pattern, 3–6 Hz activity punctuated by spikes and sharp waves in occipital leads, is associated with eye closure. Paroxysms of laughter have no relation to the EEG, ruling out this feature as a gelastic phenomenon.

EEG anomalies may be used as a quantitative biomarkers to "chart progression of AS and as clinical outcome measures". Slow delta activity (~3 Hz) is greatly increased in AS relative to typically developing children, yet more pronounced in children with partial 15q deletions as opposed to those with etiologies principally affecting UBE3A. Theta activity (~5 Hz) is much greater in children with partial 15q deletions. Thus, delta activity appears to be chiefly reflective of UBE3A dysfunction with some modulation from other 15q genes, whereas theta activity may be an electrophysiological readout of genes beyond UBE3A such as GABRA5, GABRB3, and GABRG3. Future clinical trials in AS might exploit the foregoing by using EEG as a readout of drug target engagement.

It appears that the neurons of people with Angelman syndrome are formed correctly, but they cannot function properly.

Diagnosis
The diagnosis of Angelman syndrome is based on:
 A history of delayed motor milestones and then later a delay in general development, especially of speech
 Unusual movements including fine tremors, jerky limb movements, hand flapping and a wide-based, stiff-legged gait.
 Characteristic facial appearance (but not in all cases).
 A history of epilepsy and an abnormal EEG tracing.
 A happy disposition with frequent laughter
 A deletion or inactivity on chromosome 15 by array comparative genomic hybridization (aCGH) or by BACs-on-Beads technology.

Diagnostic criteria for the disorder were initially established in 1995 in collaboration with the Angelman syndrome Foundation (US); these criteria underwent revision in 2005.

Seizures are a consequence, but so is excessive laughter, which is a major hindrance to early diagnosis.

Differential diagnosis
Other conditions that can appear similar include:
 Autism spectrum
 Cerebral palsy
 Rett syndrome
 Mowat–Wilson syndrome
 Adenylosuccinate lyase deficiency
 Pitt–Hopkins syndrome
 Phelan–McDermid syndrome
 Prader–Willi syndrome

Treatment

There is currently no cure available. The epilepsy can be controlled by the use of one or more types of anticonvulsant medications. However, there are difficulties in ascertaining the levels and types of anticonvulsant medications needed to establish control, because people with AS often have multiple types of seizures. Many families use melatonin to promote sleep in a condition which often affects sleep patterns. Many individuals with Angelman syndrome sleep for a maximum of five hours at any one time. Mild laxatives are also used frequently to encourage regular bowel movements. Early intervention with physiotherapy is sometimes used to encourage joint mobility and prevent stiffening of the joints. Speech and Language Therapy is commonly employed to assist individuals with Angelman syndrome and their communication issues.

Occupational therapists can contribute to the development and augmentation of non-verbal communication skills by addressing the foundational skills such as finger isolation, motor planning, hand-eye coordination, spatial awareness, and refining gestures. This is important because individuals with Angelman Syndrome who already possess some form of non-verbal communication have a much harder time adapting to changes in a new or existing AAC device because they can communicate their needs much faster nonverbally.

Occupational therapists can assist individuals with Angelman syndrome with many other skills as well. Many individuals with Angelman syndrome also have difficulty processing sensory information and responding appropriately to sensory stimuli. Occupational therapists can work together with these individuals to improve their visual perceptual skills and increase their sensory awareness.

Those with the syndrome are generally happy and contented people who like human contact and play. People with AS exhibit a profound desire for personal interaction with others. Communication can be difficult at first, but as a child with AS develops, there is a definite character and ability to make themselves understood. People with AS tend to develop strong non-verbal skills to compensate for their limited use of speech. It is widely accepted that their understanding of communication directed to them is much larger than their ability to return conversation. Most affected people will not develop more than 5–10 words, if any at all.

Prognosis
The severity of the symptoms associated with Angelman syndrome varies significantly across the population of those affected. Some speech and a greater degree of self-care are possible among the least profoundly affected. Walking and the use of simple sign language may be beyond the reach of the more profoundly affected. Early and continued participation in physical, occupational (related to the development of fine-motor control skills), and communication (speech) therapies are believed to significantly improve the prognosis (in the areas of cognition and communication) of individuals affected by AS. Further, the specific genetic mechanism underlying the condition is thought to correlate to the general prognosis of the affected person. On one end of the spectrum, a mutation to the UBE3A gene is thought to correlate to the least affected, whereas larger deletions on chromosome 15 are thought to correspond to the most affected.

The clinical features of Angelman syndrome alter with age. As adulthood approaches, hyperactivity and poor sleep patterns improve. The seizures decrease in frequency and often cease altogether and the EEG abnormalities are less obvious. Medication is typically advisable to those with seizure disorders. Often overlooked is the contribution of the poor sleep patterns to the frequency and/or severity of the seizures. Medication may be worthwhile to help deal with this issue and improve the prognosis with respect to seizures and sleep. Also noteworthy are the reports that the frequency and severity of seizures temporarily escalate in pubescent Angelman syndrome girls, but do not seem to affect long-term health.The facial features remain recognizable with age, but many adults with AS look remarkably youthful for their age.

Puberty and menstruation begin at around the average age.  Sexual development is thought to be unaffected, as evidenced by a single reported case of a woman with Angelman syndrome conceiving a female child who also had Angelman syndrome.

The majority of those with AS achieve continence by day and some by night. Angelman syndrome is not a degenerative syndrome, and thus people with AS may improve their living skills with support.

Dressing skills are variable and usually limited to items of clothing without buttons or zippers. Most adults can eat with a knife or spoon and fork, and can learn to perform simple household tasks. Particular problems which have arisen in adults are a tendency to obesity (more in females), and worsening of scoliosis if it is present. The affectionate nature may also persist into adult life where it can pose a problem socially, but this problem is not insurmountable. People with Angelman syndrome appear to have a reduced but near-normal life expectancy, dying on average 10 to 15 years earlier than the general population.

Epidemiology
Though the prevalence of Angelman syndrome is not precisely known, there are some estimates. The best data available are from studies of school age children, ages 6–13 years, living in Sweden and from Denmark where the diagnosis of AS children in medical clinics was compared to an 8-year period of about 45,000 births. The Swedish study showed an AS prevalence of about 1/20,000 and the Danish study showed a minimum AS prevalence of about 1/10,000.

History

Harry Angelman, a pediatrician working in Warrington, England, first reported three children with this condition in 1965. Angelman later described his choice of the title "Puppet Children" to describe these cases as being related to an oil painting he had seen while vacationing in Italy:

Case reports from the United States first began appearing in the medical literature in the early 1980s. In 1987, it was first noted that around half of the children with AS have a small piece of chromosome 15 missing (chromosome 15q partial deletion).

Society and culture
Many poems in Richard Price's poetry collections Hand Held (1997), Lucky Day (2005), and Small World (2012) reflect on the disability of the poet's daughter, who has Angelman syndrome. In the 2011 Philippine drama series Budoy, the titular character and main protagonist Budoy Maniego (played by Filipino actor Gerald Anderson) is diagnosed with Angelman syndrome.

References

External links

 
  GeneReviews/NCBI/NIH/UW entry on Angelman syndrome

Neurological disorders
Rare syndromes
Syndromes affecting the nervous system
Genodermatoses
Autosomal monosomies and deletions
Learning disabilities
Disorders causing seizures
Wikipedia medicine articles ready to translate